Honglou Times Square is a  tall skyscraper in Lanzhou, Gansu, China. Construction started in 2012 and was completed in 2018. It is the tallest building in Gansu.

The building was developed by the Lanzhou Minbai Group, a subsidiary of Zhejiang Honglou Group, at a cost of 2 billion yuan and constructed by Zhejiang Construction Group. On 13 April 2018, a fire broke out on the 11th floor while the building was still under construction.

The skyscraper has 59 floors in total, including 3 underground floors. On the 55th floor, at 240 m, there is a publicly accessible viewing area. In addition, there is a glass skywalk. The building is used for shopping malls, restaurants, entertainment, offices and hotels.

Floor use

See also

List of tallest buildings in China

References

Buildings and structures under construction in China
Buildings and structures in Lanzhou